Ili-ishmani (  i3-li2-isz-ma-ni) was a ruler of Elam around 2200 BCE. His name is purely Akkadian, and he was in charge of Elam at the time of Naram-Sin and/or Shar-Kali-Sharri, and probably their vassal. His title of "Military Governor" (Shakkanakku in Akkadian, GIR.NITA in Sumerian) suggests that he was a dependent of the Akkadian kings, rather than an independent ruler. Ili-ishmani rose from the position of scribe, already one of the top three positions in the land, to the position of Governor.

His predecessor was probably Epirmupi. After him, and the weakening of the Akkadian Empire, rule in Elam probably reverted to local rulers of the Awan Dynasty.

Axe fragment
The fragment of an axe is known, which was dedicated by Ili-ishmani. It reads:

Seal inscription
A seal found in Lagash also has the inscription "Ili-ishmani Governor (Ensi) of Susa" ( Ili-ishmani ensi Shushanki).

References

Elamite people
Elamite kings
23rd-century BC rulers
Awan Dynasty